Robert Neff (born October 9, 1995) is an American artistic gymnast.

In 2019, he represented the United States at the Pan American Games held in Lima, Peru and he won the silver medal in the men's pommel horse event. He also won the silver medal both in the floor exercise and in the men's artistic team all-around event.

References

External links 
 

Living people
1995 births
Place of birth missing (living people)
American male artistic gymnasts
Gymnasts at the 2019 Pan American Games
Medalists at the 2019 Pan American Games
Pan American Games silver medalists for the United States
Pan American Games medalists in gymnastics
Competitors at the 2017 Summer Universiade
Stanford Cardinal men's gymnasts
20th-century American people
21st-century American people